This is a list of all the United States Supreme Court cases from volume 493 of the United States Reports:

External links

1989 in United States case law
1990 in United States case law